The Suzuki method is a music curriculum and teaching philosophy dating from the mid-20th century, created by Japanese violinist and pedagogue Shinichi Suzuki (1898–1998). The method aims to create an environment for learning music which parallels the linguistic environment of acquiring a native language. Suzuki believed that this environment would also help to foster good moral character.

Background
The Suzuki Method was conceived in the mid-20th century by Shinichi Suzuki, a Japanese violinist. As a skilled violinist but a beginner at the German language who struggled to learn it, Suzuki noticed that children pick up their native language quickly, whereas adults consider even dialects "difficult" to learn but are spoken with ease by children at age five or six. He reasoned that if children have the skill to acquire their native language, they have the necessary ability to become proficient on a musical instrument. Suzuki decided to develop his teaching method (rather than become a professional violinist) after a conversation with Leonor Michaelis, who was Professor of Biochemistry at the University of Nagoya.

Suzuki pioneered the idea that preschool age children could learn to play the violin if the learning steps were small enough and the instrument was scaled down to fit their body. He modeled his method, which he called , after his theories of natural language acquisition. Suzuki believed that every child, if properly taught, was capable of a high level of musical achievement. He also made it clear that the goal of such musical education was to raise generations of children with "noble hearts" (as opposed to creating famous musical prodigies).

Philosophy
The central belief of Suzuki, based on his language acquisition theories, is that all people can (and will) learn from their environment. The essential components of his method spring from the desire to create the "right environment" for learning music (he believed that this positive environment would also help to foster excellent character in every student). These components include:

Saturation in the musical community. 
This includes attending local classical music concerts, developing friendships with other music students, and listening to recordings of professional musicians in the home every day, starting before birth if possible.
Deliberate avoidance of musical aptitude tests or auditions to begin music study. 
Suzuki believed that teachers who test for musical aptitude before taking students, or who look only for "talented" students, are limiting themselves to people who have already started their music education. Just as every child is expected to learn their native language, Suzuki expected every child to be able to learn to play music.
Emphasis on playing from a very young age.
Suzuki believed that children should typically start formal instruction between the ages of three and five years old. (See Technique).
Using well-trained teachers.
Suzuki believed in training musicians not only to be better musicians, but also to be better teachers. Suzuki Associations worldwide offer ongoing teacher-training programs to prospective and continuing Suzuki teachers.
In the beginning, learning music by ear is emphasized over reading written musical notation.  
Suzuki observed that children speak before learning to read, and thought that children should also be able to play music before learning to read. To support learning by ear, students are expected to listen to recordings of the music they are learning daily. 
Memorization of all solo repertoire is expected.
The focus on memorization continues even after a student begins to use sheet music to learn new pieces. 
Music theory and note reading are left to the teacher. 
The Suzuki method does not include a formal plan or prescribe specific materials for introducing music theory and reading, in part because Suzuki created the method in a culture where music literacy was routinely taught in schools.
Regular playing in groups (including playing pieces in unison) is strongly encouraged.
Retaining and reviewing every piece of music ever learned is also strongly encouraged. 
This is intended to raise technical and musical ability. Review pieces, along with "preview" parts of music a student is yet to learn, are often used in place of the more traditional etude books. Traditional etudes and technical studies are not used in the beginning stages, which focus almost exclusively on a set of performance pieces.
Frequent public performance makes performing feel like a natural and enjoyable part of being a musician.

The method discourages competitive attitudes between players, and advocates collaboration and mutual encouragement for those of every ability and level. However, this does not mean the elimination of auditions or evaluations of student performances. (This statement does not contradict the second bullet in this section: “Deliberate avoidance of musical aptitude tests or auditions to begin music study. ”, because that second bullet is saying all can start learning. Some will progress faster than others and this could be measured later with auditions.)

The parent of the young student is expected to supervise instrument practice every day, instead of leaving the child to practice alone between lessons, and to attend and take notes at every lesson so they can coach the student effectively. This element of the method is so prominent that a newspaper article once dubbed it "The Mom-Centric Method."

Technique
Although Suzuki was a violinist, the method he founded is not a "school of violin playing" (like the French or the Russian schools of playing) whose students can be identified by the set of techniques they use to play the violin. However, some of the technical concepts Suzuki taught his own students, such as the development of "tonalization", were so essential to his way of teaching that they have been carried over into the entire method. Other non-instrument specific techniques are used to implement the basic elements of the philosophy in each discipline.

Tonalization is a term coined by Suzuki, and is deliberately similar to the word "vocalization" (as it is used by singers when they talk about warming up their voices).  Tonalization is defined as the student's ability to produce and recognize a beautiful, ringing tone quality on their instrument. While initially developed for violin education, the tonalization technique has been applied to other instruments such as the piano. Suzuki believed that a student must learn tonalization in order to properly reproduce and perform music (Lavie, Karen, New Zealand Suzuki Journal, 2005).  Outside the Suzuki method, the term used is "tone production," and is part of Western music education stretching back to its beginning. 
Using sound recordings is another technique common to all the musical instruments taught in the Suzuki method.  Thibeault's (2018) history of Suzuki's mediated pedagogy presents Suzuki as a technological innovator who created new ways of learning from sound recordings. Pre-recorded music is used to help students learn notes, phrasing, dynamics, rhythm, and beautiful tone quality by ear. Suzuki pointed out that great artists (such as Mozart) were surrounded with excellent performances from birth, and that the advent of recording technology made this aspect of their environment possible to achieve for large numbers of "ordinary" people whose parents were not themselves great musicians & music teachers like Mozart's father was.  So-called "traditional" (that is, not Suzuki trained) music educators have used this technique since the earliest days of recording technology; the difference in the Suzuki method is the scale on which Suzuki systematically insisted on daily listening in the home, from before birth if possible, and his focus on using recordings of beginner's repertoire alongside recordings of advanced repertoire.
Instruments are adapted to meet the demands of a small child's body in various ways.  This lowers the age at which people are anatomically ready to begin studying an instrument.  Scaled-down instrument sizes are used for children studying stringed instruments. Curved-headjoint flutes with displaced keys (which are closer together than normal flute keys) and holes are also available, making it possible for children as young as three to study the flute through the Suzuki method.  Height-adjustable chairs, benches, and footrests are used for piano, guitar, cello, and string bass.  Although fractional-sized student violins were available when Suzuki began to teach, the success and popularity of his idea that pre-school aged children could also learn to play prompted violinmakers to scale violins down to even smaller sizes than before.
Suzuki Institutes were established to encourage a musical community, train teachers, and provide a place where master teachers' ideas can be spread to the whole community of Suzuki students, teachers and parents.  These short term music festivals began in Matsumoto, Japan, where teachers & students came to learn from Suzuki.  In the US, they often last for a week or two and include daily masterclasses; repertoire (group) classes; teacher training courses; concerts; discussion sessions; seminars; and various 'enrichment' classes in different musical styles, instruments, or non-musical (usually arts, crafts, or dancing) activities.  As at any music festival, participants must pay registration and tuition fees to the institute they are attending.  Each national Suzuki association handles registration for teacher training, and policies differ from country to country.
A common repertoire for all students of an instrument was established.  This body of music allows each student to participate in group classes, helps foster local and international musical community and camaraderie, and provides motivation for students to learn new music while keeping the 'old' pieces they have learned in top form.  This is in direct contrast to music education outside of the method, in which teachers tailor the repertoire to the current need and level of the individual student.

Repertoire
The core Suzuki literature is published on audio recordings and in sheet music books for each instrument, and Suzuki teachers supplement the repertoire common to each instrument as needed, particularly in the area of teaching reading.  One of the innovations of the Suzuki method was to make quality recordings of the beginners' pieces widely available, performed by professional musicians. Many traditional (non-Suzuki trained) music teachers also use the Suzuki repertoire, often to supplement their curriculum, and they adapt the music to their own philosophies of teaching.

Another innovation of Suzuki was to deliberately leave out the large amount of technical instructions and exercises found in many beginners' music books of his day. He favored a focus on melodic song-playing over technical exercises, and asked teachers to allow students to make music from the beginning, helping to motivate young children with short, attractive songs which can themselves be used as technique building exercises. Each song in the common repertoire is carefully chosen to introduce some new or higher level of technique than the previous selection.

Suzuki teaching uses a common core repertoire for students of the same instrument worldwide, and although it focuses on Western European "classical" music, it emphasizes that this music can be a bridge across cultural and language barriers: one does not have to share the ethnic or national origin of the composers in order to learn or share the music. Suzuki created a series of rhythmic variations on the theme "Twinkle, Twinkle, Little Star", using rhythms from more advanced literature in units small enough for a beginner to grasp quickly. Although these variations were created for violin, most of the instruments use them as a starting point for their repertoire.

Violin
The violin method was compiled and edited by Suzuki in ten volumes, beginning with Suzuki's Variations on "Twinkle Twinkle Little Star" and ending with two Mozart concertos. The first 3 books are mostly graded arrangements of music not originally written for solo violin, although book 1 contains several original compositions by Suzuki for violin & piano. These arrangements are drawn from folk tunes and from composers such as Bach, Telemann, Dvořák, Beethoven, Schubert, Handel, Paganini, Boccherini and Brahms. Books 4–10 continue the graded selection by incorporating 'standard' or 'traditional' student violin solos by Seitz, Vivaldi, Bach, Veracini, Corelli, Dittersdorf, Rameau, Handel, Mozart, Fiocco, and others. The Suzuki violin repertoire is currently in the process of being revised by the International Suzuki Association, and as part of the revision process, each regional Suzuki Association provides a recommended list of supplemental repertoire appropriate for students in books 6-8. The SAA supplemental repertoire list includes pieces by Bach, Kreisler, Elgar, Bartok, Shostakovich, Copland, and others (Suggested Supplementary Repertoire, 2013, and Preucil, 1985).

The most recent audio recordings are Books 1-3 recorded by Hilary Hahn and released in 2020. Audio recordings for books 1-4 are also available in separate albums by artists such as David Nadien, David Cerone, Yukari Tate and Shin'ichi Suzuki. Recordings of volumes 1-4 by William Preucil, Jr. were released in 2007, along with revised versions of the first 4 books.  Recordings for books 5-8 have been made by Koji Toyoda, although many of the pieces can be found separately on other artists' albums. In 2008 Takako Nishizaki made a complete set of recordings of Books 1-8 for Naxos Records. There are no official recordings of books 9 and 10 but these books, simply being Mozart's A major and D major violin concertos, have readily available recordings by various violinists. Completing the 10 volumes is not the end of the Suzuki journey, as many Suzuki violin teachers traditionally continue with the Bruch and Mendelssohn concertos, along with pieces from other composers such as Paradis,
Mozart, and Kreisler.

Viola
The viola repertoire is in nine volumes, compiled and edited by Doris Preucil. Like the violin repertoire, much of the viola repertoire is drawn from the Baroque period. The first 3 volumes have been arranged (or transposed) almost directly from the first 3 violin volumes, and the rest differ significantly as they delve into standard viola literature.  The viola books introduce shifting and work in higher positions earlier than the violin volumes, in anticipation of viola students being asked to play in ensembles sooner in their studies than violinists, and needing these skills to better handle orchestral or chamber music parts (Preucil, 1985). Viola volumes 4-8 include works by Telemann, Casadesus, Bach, Mendelssohn, Vivaldi, Leclair, Hummel, and Bruch. Books 1-4 have been recorded on two albums by William Preucil, and the rest are available in separate albums.

Cello
The cello repertoire is in ten volumes, with some early pieces arranged from the early violin volumes, and the first distinct piece (the second) being "French Folk Song". Tsuyoshi Tsutsumi performs volumes 1 through 4. Volumes 4-10 contain works by: Vivaldi, Saint-Saëns, Popper, Breval, Goltermann, Squire, Bach, Paradis, Eccles, Fauré, van Goens, Sammartini, Haydn, and Boccherini.

Piano
The piano repertoire is composed of seven volumes. The first book begins with Variations on "Twinkle, Twinkle, Little Star" (as with the violin books) and continues with many folk songs and contemporary songs. As one progresses to the second book, there are pieces written by romantic, classical and baroque composers, such as Robert Schumann, Ludwig van Beethoven and Johann Sebastian Bach. The third book is early intermediate level with several sonatinas and beginning with Sonatina in C Major, Op. 36, No. 1 by Muzio Clementi. The fourth book includes Sonata in G Major, Op. 49, No. 2 by Ludwig van Beethoven and ends with Minuet 1,  Minuet 2 and the Gigue from Partita in B by J.S. Bach.  The fifth book begins with the famous "Für Elise" by Beethoven and includes Sonata in C Major, Hob. XVI/35 by Franz Joseph Haydn. The sixth book begins with the Sonata in C Major, K.545 by W.A. Mozart, and the seventh book begins with the Piano Sonata No. 11 in A Major by Mozart. This book also includes "The Harmonious Blacksmith" by Handel and Romanian Folk Dances by Béla Bartók. There are also many minuets in the second book. The New International Edition adds some more recent compositions to the books, such as the music of Béla Bartók. Revised versions of the piano books have now been published.  The new volumes are collections of piano repertoire from all eras representing works by composers such as Mozart, Burgmüller, Beethoven, Bach, Tcherepnin, Tchaikovsky, Schumann, Chopin, Mendelssohn, Daquin, Grieg, Granados, Villa-Lobos, Scarlatti, Handel, Bartók, and Debussy. Many pieces from the original books remain; some have been shifted to another volume. The book/CD combo for Revised Books 4-7 is now available, and was performed by Japanese concert artist Seizo Azuma.

Bass
Currently there are five printed volumes in the double bass series, with the first three volumes also available on recordings. Nine volumes are planned and being compiled and edited by Dr. S Daniel Swaim (SAA, Chair), Virginia Dixon (SAA), Michael Fanelli (SAA), Domenick Fiore (SAA), and Eugene Rebeck (SAA). Volume 1 and 2 contain arrangements of the traditional Suzuki violin pieces mixed in with some new arrangements of other pieces. Volume 3 contains some new transcriptions of jazz, Gaelic, and folk songs; plus works by Handel, Gossec, Beethoven, Bach, Webster, Saint-Saëns, and Dvořák. Famous pieces include: "The Elephant" from Carnival of the Animals by Saint-Saëns, Ode to Joy by Beethoven, and "Largo" from the New World Symphony by Dvořák.

Flute
The flute repertoire is compiled and edited by Toshio Takahashi. In fourteen volumes, beginning with Mary Had a Little Lamb and ending in the Flute Concerto by Otaka. Also included are concerti by Mozart, Cimarosa, Ibert and Quantz. Students also study music by Bach, Handel, Blavet, Fauré and other major composers.

Recorder
There are eight volumes of recorder repertoire for both soprano and alto recorder. The recorder repertoire shares some early repertoire with other instruments, such as "Twinkle Twinkle Little Star", several Bach Minuets, etc. Later books delve into more complex Renaissance and Baroque music, including instruction in intense Baroque ornamentation along with 17th-century Dutch and Italian articulation techniques.

Guitar
The classical guitar repertoire was compiled through a collaborative process involving teachers from the United States, Europe and Australia, and edited by Frank Longay. The nine volumes begin with Twinkle Variations and many folk songs, and adds pieces originally written for the lute in the Renaissance, and spanning all musical time periods, including pieces by Sanz, Vivaldi, Bach, Carcassi, Giuliani, Sor, Tarrega, Albéniz, Mudarra, and Yocoh's Sakura Variations.  Music in book one is performed by Frank Longay and Bill Kossler, with books two through four recorded by Seth Himmelhoch, Andrew LaFrenier, and Louis Brown.  George Sakellariou has recorded books five, six and seven and William Kanengiser recorded books 8 and 9, with the exception of Recuerdos de la Alhambra in book 9, which was recorded by Scott Tennant.

Harp
The harp repertoire is in five volumes. These books are suitable for learning to read and play music on the pedal harp or the lever harp (folk harp, Irish/Celtic harp, etc. that preferably has 30 or more strings). Most of the music is arrangements of either folk music or classical music. Students of the lever harp will find some of the pieces in the later books to have challenging lever changes. This series ultimately leads to more in-depth study of the pedal harp and its repertoire and teaches more of a classical style technique. Those pursuing traditional Celtic music can use this as a foundation, however, the traditional style of teaching focuses on relying on the ear rather than on the written note. Repertoire for volume six is selected, though the music is not published in a single book.

Voice
The voice repertoire is in five Levels. Developed in Finland since 1986, the vocal repertoire of the Suzuki method has spread to over 20 countries including The United States, Australia, Europe, Asia and New Zealand. Teacher training courses are scheduled yearly in Europe, US and Australia.

Organ
The pipe organ repertoire was compiled and edited by Gunilla Rönnberg and Lars Hagström beginning in 1998. Currently Volumes 1-8 have been published (Alfred Publishing, 2019). As of 2011, an active Suzuki-training organ scheme is under way in the Australian city of Newcastle.

Mandolin
The application of Suzuki's teaching philosophy to the mandolin is currently being researched in Italy by Amelia Saracco.

Early childhood education (SECE) and Suzuki in the schools
Rather than focusing on a specific instrument, at the stage of early childhood education (ECE), a Suzuki Early Childhood Education (SECE) curriculum for (pre-instrumental) ECE was developed within the Suzuki philosophy by Dorothy & Sharon Jones (SAA), Jeong Cheol Wong (ASA), Emma O'Keefe (PPSA), Anke van der Bijl (ESA), and Yasuyo Matsui (TERI). The SECE curriculum is designed for ages 0–3 and uses singing, nursery rhymes, percussion, audio recordings, and whole body movements in a group setting where children and their adult caregivers participate side by side. The Japanese based SECE curriculum is different from the English-based SECE curriculum. The English-based curriculum is currently being adapted for use in other languages.

A "modified" Suzuki philosophy curriculum has been developed to apply Suzuki teaching to heterogeneous instrumental music classes & string orchestras in schools.

Trumpet
Trumpet was added to the International Suzuki Association's list of Suzuki Method instruments in 2011. The application of Suzuki's teaching philosophy to the trumpet is currently being researched in Sweden; the first Trumpet teacher training course to be offered by the European Suzuki Association in 2013. (Suzuki Teacher Training for Trumpet, 2013).

Supplemental materials
Supplementary materials are also published under the Suzuki name, including some etudes, note-reading books, piano accompaniment parts, guitar accompaniment parts, duets, trios, string orchestra, and string quartet arrangements of Suzuki repertoire.

Historical notes

In the late 19th century, Japan's borders were opened to trade with the outside world, and in particular to the importation of Western Culture.  As a result of this, Suzuki's father, who owned a company which had manufactured the Shamisen, began to manufacture violins instead. (Nurtured by Love Documentary) In his youth, Shin'ichi Suzuki chanced to hear a phonograph recording of Franz Schubert's Ave Maria, as played on violin by Mischa Elman.  Gripped by the beauty of the music, he immediately picked up a violin from his father's factory and began to teach himself to play the instrument "by ear".  His father felt that instrumental performance was beneath his son's social status, and refused to allow him to study the instrument.  At age 17, he began to teach himself by ear, since no formal training was allowed to him.  Eventually he convinced his father to allow him to study with a violin teacher in Tokyo. (Suzuki, Nurtured by Love)

At age 22, Suzuki travelled to Germany to find a violin teacher to continue his studies. While there, he studied privately with Karl Klingler, but did not receive any formal degree past his high school diploma.  He met and became friends with Albert Einstein, who encouraged him in learning classical music. He also met, courted, and married his wife, Waltraud.(Suzuki, Nurtured by Love)

In 1945, Suzuki began his Talent Education movement in Matsumoto, Japan shortly after the end of World War II. Raising children with "noble hearts" (inspired by great music and diligent study) was one of his primary goals; he believed that people raised and "nurtured by love" in his method would grow up to achieve better things than war. One of his students during this post-1945 period was violinist Hidetaro Suzuki, no relation, who later became a veteran of international violin competitions (Tchaikovsky, Queen Elizabeth, Montreal International) and then the longtime concertmaster of the Indianapolis Symphony Orchestra. (Hermann, 1981)

Eventually, the center of the Suzuki movement in education was established as the Talent Education Research Institute (TERI) in Matsumoto. TERI hosts thousands of people each year—students, parents, teachers, (and teacher trainees). Other organizations have sprung up all over the world to help oversee the movement and train teachers. These include the Asia Suzuki Association, the Suzuki Association of the Americas, the European Suzuki Association (which is currently assisting in the beginnings of the Suzuki movement in Africa), and the Pan-Pacific Suzuki Association.(International Suzuki Association, 2016).

John D. Kendall of Southern Illinois University Edwardsville brought the Suzuki method, along with adaptations to better fit the requirements of the American classroom, to the United States in the late 1950s and early 1960s (Nurtured by Love Documentary). Vilem Sokol of the Seattle Youth Symphony hosted Suzuki in Seattle. The majority of American Suzuki pedagogues and teaching methods are grounded in the Suzuki-Kendall system.  Other pioneers of the Suzuki Method in the US include Clifford Cook, Roland and Almita Vamos, Elizabeth and Harlow Mills, Betty Haag, Louise Behrend, Dorothy Roffman, William Starr, Anastasia Jempelis, and Margery Aber.

See also

Blanche Ray Alden
Shinichi Suzuki (violinist)

References

Sources
Barber, Barbara (Autumn, 1991). "Traditional & Suzuki Teaching: A Comparison". American String Teacher.
Bradley, Jane (Spring 2005).  "When to Twinkle – Are Children Ever Too Young?". American Suzuki Journal Vol. 33, #3, p53.
Campell, Don. The Mozart Effect for Children. Harper Collins Publishers, Inc., New York, NY, 2000, 
Hermann, Evelyn. Shinichi Suzuki: The Man and his Philosophy. Warner Brothers Publications, 1981, .
International Suzuki Association Website  Retrieved January 14, 2016.
Kelly, Birte (2002). International Suzuki Association: Regional Suzuki Associations. Retrieved February 21, 2007.
Kreitman, Edward. Teaching from the Balance Point: A Guide for Suzuki Teachers, Parents, and Students.  Western Springs School of Talent Education Publications, Western Springs, IL, 1998.
Lavie, Karen (Summer, 2005).  "On Gastronomy and Tonalization." New Zealand Suzuki Journal Vol. 16, #4, pp. 5–6.
Meyer, Constance (2003, 7 September). The Mom-Centric Method. Los Angeles Times, Classical Music.
Nurtured by Love: The life and work of Shinichi Suzuki [Video Documentary]. Produced by The Cleveland Institute of Music. Telos Productions, Inc.
Preucil, William & Doris (November, 1985). "The Evolution of the Suzuki Viola School". Journal of the American Viola Society Vol. 1, #2, pp18-20.
Suggested Supplementary Repertoire for Suzuki Violin School Volumes 6, 7 & 8. Suzuki Association of the Americas Website, May 2013. Retrieved January 14, 2016.  Retrieved January 14, 2016.
Suzuki Organ Website , Retrieved June 20, 2010
Suzuki, Shinichi.  Nurtured By Love: A New Approach to Talent Education. Warner bros. Publication, Miami, Florida, 1968
Suzuki, Shinichi.  Ability Development from Age Zero.  Warner bros. Publication, Miami, Florida, 1981
Suzuki Talent Education Association of Australia (Vic) Inc., (Copyright 2005).  History of the Suzuki Method.  Retrieved November 29, 2008.
Suzuki Teacher Training for Trumpet. Suzuki Association of the Americas Website , Retrieved July 15, 2013.
Thibeault, M. D. (2018). Learning with Sound Recordings: A History of Suzuki’s Mediated Pedagogy. Journal of Research in Music Education, 66(1), 6–30. https://doi.org/10.1177/0022429418756879

External links

International Suzuki Association
European Suzuki Association
Suzuki Association of the Americas
Asia Region Suzuki Association
Talent Education Research Institute
Pan-Pacific Suzuki Association
The American Suzuki Institute at the University of Wisconsin–Stevens Point: The Suzuki Method in Action: An online collection documenting Suzuki and his teaching methodology.

Kristian Bush talks about music, the Suzuki Method, and Southern Gravity on Ben Sorensen's REAL Country

Music education
Pedagogy
Philosophy of education